Scotch Street  is a village in County Armagh, Northern Ireland. It is within the townland of Timakeel (from the Irish Tigh Mhic Caoil) and part of the Armagh City, Banbridge and Craigavon Borough Council area. In the 2001 Census it had a population of 120 people. Currently there is estimated to be around 1000 people living there.

Within the village there is a post office, gospel hall, primary school and a filling station/mace shop. There were recent additions to the village when outlets for five new shops were built. Moved in were; a chip shop, hair salon and a butcher. Since then the butcher has been very successful becoming one of the most popular around County Armagh.

Richmount Primary School has grown in numbers since the building of new estates on either side of Scotch Street.

Scotch Street is mainly a unionist area, with a majority population of Protestants living in the area. There has been an increasing number of foreign nationals who also live in the area.

The village is the only significant settlement between the large town of Portadown in County Armagh and the village of Moy in County Tyrone. Rapid growth in the population of the settlement has come about with the development of many new housing estates including Keelmount Grange and Timakeel Close.

References 
NI Neighbourhood Information System

See also 
List of villages in Northern Ireland
List of towns in Northern Ireland

Villages in County Armagh